The IBM Personal Computer AT (model 5170, abbreviated as IBM AT or PC/AT) was released in 1984 as the fourth model in the IBM Personal Computer line, following the IBM PC/XT and its IBM Portable PC variant. It was designed around the Intel 80286 microprocessor.

Name 
IBM did not specify an expanded form of "AT" on the machine, press releases, brochures or documentation, but some sources expand the term as "Advanced Technology", including at least one internal IBM document.

History
IBM's 1984 introduction of the AT was seen as an unusual move for the company, which typically waited for competitors to release new products before producing its own models. At $4,000–6,000, it was only slightly more expensive than considerably slower IBM models. The announcement surprised rival executives, who admitted that matching IBM's prices would be difficult. No major competitor showed a comparable computer at COMDEX Las Vegas that year.

Features 
The AT is IBM PC compatible, with the most significant difference being a move to the 80286 processor from the 8088 processor of prior models. Like the IBM PC, the AT supported an optional math co-processor chip, the Intel 80287, for faster execution of floating point operations.

In addition, it introduces the AT bus, later known as the ISA bus, a 16-bit bus with backwards compatibility with 8-bit PC-compatible expansion cards. The bus also offered fifteen IRQs and seven DMA channels, expanded from eight IRQs and four DMA channels for the PC, achieved by adding another 8259A IRQ controller and another 8237A DMA controller. Some IRQ and DMA channels are used by the motherboard and not exposed on the expansion bus.  Both dual IRQ and DMA chipsets are cascading which shares the primary pair. In addition to these chipsets, Intel 82284 Clock Driver and Ready Interface and Intel 82288 Bus Controller are to support the microprocessor.

The 24-bit address bus of the 286 expands RAM capacity to 16 MB.

PC DOS 3.0 was included with support for the new AT features, including preliminary kernel support for networking (which was fully supported in a later version 3.x release).

The motherboard includes a battery backed real-time clock (RTC) using the Motorola MC146818. This was an improvement from the PC, which required setting the clock manually or installing an RTC expansion card. The RTC also included a 1024 Hz timer (on IRQ 8), a much finer resolution than the 18 Hz timer on the PC.

In addition to keeping the time, the RTC includes 50 bytes of CMOS memory which is used to store software-adjustable BIOS parameters. A disk-based BIOS setup program which saved to this memory took the place of the DIP switches used to set system settings on PCs. Most AT clones have the setup program in ROM rather than on disk.

Storage 
The standard floppy drive was upgraded to a 1.2 MB  inch floppy disk drive (15 sectors of 512 bytes, 80 tracks, two sides), which stored over three times as much data as the 360 KB PC floppy disk, but had compatibility problems with 360k disks (see Problems below).  inch floppy drives became available in later ATs.

A 20 MB hard disk drive was included as standard. Early drives were manufactured by Computer Memories and were found to be very unreliable.

Peripherals 
The AT included the AT keyboard, initially a new 84-key layout (the 84th key being SysRq). The numerical keypad was now clearly separated from the main key group, and indicator LEDs were added for Caps Lock, Scroll Lock and Num Lock. The AT keyboard uses the same 5-pin DIN connector as the PC keyboard, but a different, bidirectional electrical interface with different keyboard scan codes. The bidirectional interface allows the computer to set the LED indicators on the keyboard, reset the keyboard, set the typematic rate, and other features. Later ATs included 101-key keyboards.

The AT is also equipped with a physical lock that prevents access to the computer by disabling the keyboard.

ATs could be equipped with CGA, MDA, EGA, or PGA video cards.

The 8250 UART from the PC was upgraded to the 16450, but since both chips had single-byte buffers, high-speed serial communication was problematic as with the XT.

Power supply 
The IBM PC AT came with a 192-watt switching power supply, significantly higher than the 130-watt XT power supply.

According to IBM's documentation, in order to function properly, the AT power supply needed a load of at least 7.0 amperes on the +5 V line and a minimum of 2.5 amperes on its +12 V line. The power supply would fail to start unless these minimum load requirements were met, but the AT motherboard did not provide much load on the +12 V line. To solve this problem, entry-level IBM AT models that did not have a hard drive were shipped with a 5-ohm, 50-watt resistor connected on the +12 V line of the hard disk power connector. In normal operation this resistor drew 2.4 amperes (dissipating 28.8 watts), getting fairly hot.

Problems 
In addition to the unreliable hard disk drive, the high-density floppy disk drives turned out to be problematic.  Some ATs came with one high-density (HD) disk drive and one double-density (DD) 360 kB drive. High-density floppy diskette media were compatible only with high-density drives.

There was no way for the disk drive to detect what kind of floppy disk was inserted, and the drives were not distinguished except by an asterisk molded into the 360 kB disk drive faceplate. If the user accidentally used a high-density diskette in the 360 kB drive, it would sometimes work, for a while, but the high-coercivity oxide would take a very weak magnetization from the 360 kB write heads, so reading the diskette would be problematic.

Conversely, the high-density drive's heads had a track width half that of the 360 kB drive, so they were incapable of fully erasing and overwriting tracks written by a 360 kB drive. Overwriting a DD disk that had been written in a DD drive with an HD drive would result in a disk that read on an HD drive, but produced read errors in a DD drive.  Whereas a HD read head would only pick up the half track that drive had written, the wider DD read head would pick up the half-track written by the HD drive mixed with the unerased half-track remnant of the track written earlier by a DD drive. Thus, the DD drive would end up reading both new and old information together, causing it to "see" garbled data.

Clones 
Due to a US antitrust consent decree with IBM, the PC AT architecture was functionally an open design, and IBM's efforts to trademark the AT name largely failed. Many 286-based PCs were modeled after it and marketed as "AT-compatible". The label also became a standard term in reference to PCs that used the same type of power supply, case, and motherboard layout as the 5170. "AT-class" became a term describing any machine which supported the same BIOS functions, 80286 or greater processor, 16-bit expansion slots, keyboard interface, 1.2 MB  inch floppy disk drives and other defining technical features of the IBM PC AT.

In the United States, popular brands of AT clones included the Tandy 3000, Compaq Deskpro 286, HP Vectra, Zenith Z-286, Epson Equity Models II+ and III, and Commodore PC-30 and PC-40. In Europe, on the other hand, most AT-clones sold were more or less anonymous.

The AT bus became the de facto "ISA" (Industry Standard Architecture), while PC XT slots were retroactively named "8-bit ISA". The disk interface was standardized as "ATA" which evolved and was later renamed "PATA" (Parallel AT Attachment). Further, the same interface was originally named "IDE" after the fact that the drive controller was on the drive (Integrated Drive Electronics) and not on the interface card. The name "IDE" stuck and is more commonly known, but "ATA" refers to the interface specifically.

Reception
Creative Computing chose the AT as the best desktop computer when "price is no object" for 1984, describing it as "an innovative, state-of-the-art computer that has the competition gasping for breath". An industry analyst wrote in Computerworld in 1985 that the AT's power was evidence of IBM's belief that personal computers were more important for the company than minicomputers.

See also 
 Industry Standard Architecture
 AT (form factor)

References 

Notes

 IBM (1986). Personal Computer Hardware Reference Library: Guide to Operations, Personal Computer XT Model 286. IBM Part Number 68X2523.
 PC AT entry at old-computers.com

External links
 Cover story: "IBM brings out the big guns", PC Mag 13 Nov 1984, pp. 117–133
 Wiki entry for PC AT at the Vintage Computer Forums
 Historycorner.de – The IBM PC AT (IBM 5170) 
 IBM 5170 information at www.minuszerodegrees.net

Personal Computer/AT
16-bit computers
Computer-related introductions in 1984